Norman Williams (20 July 1864 – 4 April 1928) was a New Zealand cricketer. He played three first-class matches for Auckland between 1893 and 1895.

See also
 List of Auckland representative cricketers

References

External links
 

1864 births
1928 deaths
New Zealand cricketers
Auckland cricketers